Events in the year 1994 in Bulgaria.

Incumbents 

 President: Zhelyu Zhelev
 Prime Minister: Lyuben Berov (from 1992 until October 17) Reneta Indzhova (from October 17 until 1995)

Events 

 The International Commission for the Protection of the Danube River (ICPDR), an organisation established by the Danube River Protection Convention, was signed by the Danube countries in Sofia, Bulgaria.

Deaths
November 2 - Grisha Filipov, prime minister (1981-1986)

References 

 
1990s in Bulgaria
Years of the 20th century in Bulgaria
Bulgaria
Bulgaria